Yogesh Lakhani is an Indian film actor, producer and the founder and head of Bright Outdoor Media, best know as the producer of action romance Indo-Nepalese film Prem Geet 3 (2022). Lakhni has worked as an actor in films like Dilwale (2015), Calendar Girls  (2015), Baazaar (2018), Bypass Road (2019) and Ardh (2022).

Filmography

Actor 
 Dilwale (2015)
 Calendar Girls  (2015)
 Baazaar (2018)
 Bypass Road (2019)
 Ardh (2022)

Producer 
 Prem Geet 3 (2022)

References

External links
 
 

Living people
Indian male film actors
Hindi film producers
1963 births